Lyfe Change is the third studio album by Lyfe Jennings, released on April 29, 2008.

"The album is called Lyfe Change because I'm changing it up a bit," explains Lyfe. "In the past I didn't work with different producers, I produced and wrote most of my albums by myself. But on this project I actually worked with different producers and a few writers."

The first single off the album is called "Cops Up". It peaked at number 68 on Billboard Hot R&B/Hip-Hop Songs. The song was originally written for R&B duo, Luke & Q.

The second single is called "Never Never Land". It peaked at number 21 on Billboard Hot R&B/Hip-Hop Songs.

The third single has been released and is called "Will I Ever".

Lyfe Change debuted at number four on the U.S. Billboard 200 chart, selling about 80,000 copies in its opening week.

In the limited edition of the CD came with a DVD featuring a Live Performance in an Ohio Prison and the "Cops Up" music video.
The DVD is edited in both versions.

Track listing 

"Change the Game" (Intro) (featuring Walter Butch) - 1:33
"Keep On Dreaming" - 3:40
"Warriors" - 3:10
"Never Never Land" - 3:58
"Brand New" (featuring T.I.) - 3:10
"It's Real" - 3:10
"Cops Up" - 3:33
"You Think You Got It Bad" (featuring Wyclef Jean) - 4:18
"Wild, Wild, Wild" - 3:23
"Midnight Train" - 3:18
"Hmmm" - 3:41
"Old School" (featuring Snoop Dogg) - 4:13
"Us" (Interlude) - 1:17
"Will I Ever" - 4:51
"Baby I'm a Star" - 4:19

Lil Wayne appeared on the original version of "Brand New" but was later re-recorded and Lyfe Jennings replaced him with T.I. for the album version.  The original still exists and can be heard on YouTube.

Production 

Lyfe Jennings - Tracks 1,2,3,4,5,6,8,14,15
The Underdogs - Tracks 7,10,11
Steven Russell - Tracks 10,11
Wyclef Jean - Tracks 8,9
Jerry Wonda Duplessis - Track 8
Logic - Track 9
Luke & Q - Track 7

Charts

Weekly charts

Year-end charts

References 

2008 albums
Albums produced by the Underdogs (production team)
Albums produced by Wyclef Jean
Lyfe Jennings albums
Columbia Records albums
Hip hop albums by American artists